Krishna Poonia (born 5 May 1977) is an international gold-medalist Indian discus thrower, track-and-field athlete, 2 times Olympics participant, Padma Shri and Arjuna Award recipient, politician from Congress party and the current MLA from Sadulpur constituency in Rajasthan. She participated in 2008 and 2012 Olympic Games. In 2010 Delhi Commonwealth Games, she won a gold medal.She was appointed the President Of the Rajasthan State Sports Council in Feb. 2022.

Early life
Poonia was born on 5 May 1977 in Jat family of Agroha village of Haryana's Hisar district. She was raised by her father and paternal grandmother after her mother died when she was 9 years old. Krishna's physical fitness was honed as a result of working at her family land since the age of 15 and not exactly undergoing rigorous sports training.

In 2000, she married Virender Singh Poonia, a former athlete who coached her after their marriage. They had a son in 2001. The couple worked for Indian Railways but in 2013, Poonia resigned and joined the Congress. They live in Jaipur. Poonia obtained a Bachelor of Arts degree in sociology from Kanoria PG Mahila Mahavidyalaya in Jaipur.

Career

2010 Commonwealth Games
Poonia became the first Indian woman athlete to win a gold medal at the 2010 Commonwealth Games in New Delhi. Poonia led the historic clean sweep of the discus event by clearing 61.5 meters. She is the first Indian woman to win a gold medal in track and field events of Commonwealth Games and the first Indian to win a gold medal in such events after Milkha Singh who had won the gold in Men's 440 yards race in the 1958 Cardiff Commonwealth Games.

2012 London Olympics
She finished a creditable sixth in the women's discus throw in the 2012 London Olympics. Poonia's best effort of 63.62 m came in her fifth and penultimate attempt. She had 62.42 m in the first attempt and 61.61 in the third and 61.31 in the sixth and the final throw. She had two no-throws in the second and the fourth attempt. Earlier she became only the sixth Indian to make it to the final round of an Olympic track and field event after Milkha Singh, P T Usha, Sriram Singh, Gurbachan Singh Randhawa and Anju Bobby George.

Political career
In 2013, she joined the Indian National Congress at an election rally in Churu – her husband's home district – in the presence of Rahul Gandhi and then chief minister Ashok Gehlot after she was approached by the Congress's leadership.

In 2013 Rajasthan Legislative Assembly election, she contested and lost her first election from the Sadulpur Assembly constituency as Congress candidate where she finished third behind BJP and BSP. In 2018 Rajasthan Legislative Assembly election, she contested again and won the same seat on a Congress ticket, by a margin of 18084 votes after receiving 70020 votes.

In 2019 Lok Sabha Elections, Poonia was nominated by Congress from the Jaipur Rural constituency. She contested against Olympian Rajyavardhan Singh Rathore of the BJP. She lost to Rathore by a margin of 393171 votes.

Poonia has been helping Rajasthan State Health Ministry in its attempt to curb female foeticide as the selective abortion of female fetuses is a pressing concern in India especially in Haryana where Poonia grew up. She is also engaged in improving the infrastructure of sports for children in Jaipur and across the country.

Honors
 "Padma Shri" Civilian honour in 2011: awarded by the Government of India. 
"Arjuna Award" in 2010: awarded by the Ministry of Youth Affairs and Sports, Government of India.

See also
 Shilpi Sheoran
 Phogat sisters

References

External links
 
 
 

1977 births
Living people
Indian female discus throwers
21st-century Indian women
21st-century Indian people
Sportswomen from Haryana
People from Hisar district
Athletes (track and field) at the 2008 Summer Olympics
Athletes (track and field) at the 2012 Summer Olympics
Olympic athletes of India
Commonwealth Games gold medallists for India
Athletes (track and field) at the 2006 Commonwealth Games
Athletes (track and field) at the 2010 Commonwealth Games
Athletes (track and field) at the 2014 Commonwealth Games
Asian Games bronze medalists for India
Asian Games medalists in athletics (track and field)
Recipients of the Padma Shri in sports
Recipients of the Arjuna Award
Athletes (track and field) at the 2006 Asian Games
Athletes (track and field) at the 2010 Asian Games
Athletes (track and field) at the 2014 Asian Games
Commonwealth Games medallists in athletics
Medalists at the 2006 Asian Games
Medalists at the 2010 Asian Games
Athletes from Haryana
Rajasthan MLAs 2018–2023
Medallists at the 2010 Commonwealth Games